The Federal Death Penalty Abolition Act is a proposed United States law that would abolish the death penalty for all federal crimes and all military crimes. If enacted, this act would mark the first time since 1988 where no federal crimes carry a sentence of death.

This bill would repeal capital punishment on the federal level but would not affect the possibility for states to provide for it in state law.

History

Since the enactment of the Anti-Drug Abuse Act of 1988, the death penalty has been a legal punishment for United States federal crimes in the post Furman era. Since then, the federal government has executed sixteen individuals, with thirteen of those executions occurring between July 2020 and January 2021.

Motivation for the introduction and support for the passage and enactment of this bill have been influenced by the criminal justice reform movement, the George Floyd protests, and the thirteen people executed during the Trump administration between July 2020 and January 2021, among other things. President Joe Biden’s campaign website has stated that Biden supports abolishing the death penalty on the federal level and to incentivize states to also abolish the death penalty for crimes within their jurisdiction. Biden is the first president to openly oppose the death penalty.

Bills to abolish the federal death penalty have been introduced in each Congress since 1999, but no legislation has passed.

Provisions
The bill proposes the removal of all references to capital punishment as it pertains to federal crimes and sentencing law, abolishing the ability for the United States to impose a sentence of death in the process.

Legislative history 
As of May 15, 2022:

See also
 Capital punishment in the United States
 Capital punishment by country
 Crimes Act of 1790
 Eighth Amendment to the United States Constitution
 Furman v. Georgia
 Gregg v. Georgia
 Wrongful execution

References

Proposed legislation of the 117th United States Congress
United States federal criminal legislation
Capital punishment in the United States
Anti–death penalty laws